Forever Version is the debut album from Jamaican reggae deejay Dennis Alcapone. It was released in 1971 by Studio One, and features Alcapone toasting over some of the label's greatest hits. The album was engineered by Sylvan Morris who left large parts of the original vocal tracks in the mix, with Alcapone appearing to answer back to the singers. Tracks which formed the basis for the album include Larry Marshall's "Nanny Goat" (on "Nanny Goat Version"), The Cables' "Baby Why", Carlton and The Shoes' "Love Me Forever" ("Forever Version"), two tracks from The Heptones ("Baby Version" and "Sweet Talking Version"), and one from The Wailers ("Dancing Version"). The album was reissued by Heartbeat Records on compact disc in 1991, and again in an expanded form in 2007, with six bonus tracks.

Track listing

Original release
Nanny Version
Run Run
Riddle I This
Baby Version
Sunday Version
Version I Can Feel
Forever Version
Baby Why Version
Dancing Version
Midnight Version
Sweet Talking Version
Version You To The Ball

Additional tracks on 2007 expanded version
Home Version
El Paso
Fever Teaser
Conqueror
Power Version
Forever Version (Extended)

References

1971 debut albums
Albums produced by Coxsone Dodd
Dennis Alcapone albums